Jogan Shankar is a professor of sociology in Mangalore University. He specialises in research on Deprived groups, Industrial Sociology, Indian Society and Research Methodology.

He was appointed as the Vice-Chancellor of Kuvempu University, Shivamogga, for the period 2015 to 2019. He has also been nominated as Senate Member of Karnataka University by Governor of Karnataka.

He was awarded the Karnataka state award and a national award in 1992 and 1993, respectively, for his significant contribution towards the welfare of marginalised women and children.

References

Indian sociologists
Mangalore University
Living people
Year of birth missing (living people)